Rhabdiopoeidae is a family of trematodes belonging to the order Plagiorchiida.

Genera:
 Faredifex Blair, 1981
 Haerator Blair, 1981
 Rhabdiopoeus Johnston, 1913
 Taprobanella Crusz & Fernand, 1954

References

Plagiorchiida